The 1880 earthquake which struck Zagreb, and is also known as The Great Zagreb earthquake, occurred with a moment magnitude of 6.3 on 9 November 1880. Its epicenter was in the Medvednica mountain north of Zagreb. Although only one person was killed in the earthquake, it destroyed or damaged many buildings.

Events 
According to the Zagreb Meteorological Station data, the earthquake struck at 07:33 AM CET and was followed by a series of tremors of smaller intensity. Contemporary records say that 3,800 outgoing tickets were sold at the Zagreb Main Station within the first 24 hours of the initial earthquake, as many locals sought to leave the city for Vienna, Ljubljana, Graz, and other Austro-Hungarian cities in the vicinity of Zagreb.

City authorities formed a commission to assess the damage, and their official report said that a total of 1,758 buildings were affected (not counting churches and state-owned buildings), out of which 485 were heavily damaged. 

Croatian Academy of Sciences and Arts organized documenting of damaged buildings by prominent Zagreb photographer Ivan Standl.

The most prominent building damaged was Zagreb Cathedral, which then underwent a thorough reconstruction led by Hermann Bollé and which went on for 26 years before it was finally finished in 1906. However, the damage brought by the earthquake spurred construction and many historic buildings in the Lower Town area of the city were built in the following years.

See also
 2020 Zagreb earthquake
 List of earthquakes in Croatia
 List of historical earthquakes

References

Bibliography

Further reading

External links
Contemporary photographs of damaged buildings at Kultura.hr 
Potresi na zagrebačkom području 
Zagreb cathedral in the 1880 earthquake and its present day renovation 
Potres 1880.g.

History of Zagreb
Earthquakes in Croatia
Zagreb Earthquake, 1880
Zagreb Earthquake, 1880
November 1880 events
Earthquakes in the Kingdom of Croatia (Habsburg)
Events in the Kingdom of Hungary (1867–1918)